Abraham is a 1993 television film based on the life of the Biblical patriarch Abraham produced by Five Mile River Films. It was shot in Ouarzazate, Morocco. Directed by Joseph Sargent, it stars Richard Harris, Barbara Hershey, Maximilian Schell, and Vittorio Gassman.

Plot
Abram lives in Harran, a rich city.  His wife Sarai (Barbara Hershey) is childless, and their only heir is Eliezer of Damascus. One day he hears the voice of God, who says that he must leave Harran and travel to an unknown land.  God promises to make a great nation from him and renames him Abraham and his wife Sarai as Sarah.  The pattern for the plot is the Genesis chapters 11–25.

Cast
 Richard Harris as Abraham
 Barbara Hershey as Sarah
 Maximilian Schell as Pharaoh
 Vittorio Gassman as Terah
 Carolina Rosi as Hagar
 Andrea Prodan as Lot
 Gottfried John as Eliezer
 Kevin McNally as Nahor, son of Terah
 Simona Ferraro Chartoff as Lot's wife
 Aziz Khaldoun as young Serug
 Tom Radcliffe as adult Serug 
 Jude Alderson as Mikah
 Evelina Meghangi as Reumah
Danny Mertsoy as Ishmael (age 9)
Giuseppe Peluso as Ishmael (age 16)
Timur Yusef as Isaac (age 5)
Taylor Scipio as Isaac (age 11)

References

TV REVIEW `Abraham' on TNT-Gritty but Appealing. Los Angeles Times, April 2, 1994
TV Weekend; A Biblical Patriarch For a Time of Worship. The New York Times, April 1, 1994

External links
 
 Abraham, part 1 (english subtitles)
 Abraham, part 2 (english subtitles)

Films based on the Book of Genesis
German drama films
Italian drama films
English-language German films
English-language Italian films
1993 television films
1993 films
1993 drama films
TNT Network original films
German television films
Italian television films
Cultural depictions of Abraham
Films about Christianity
Films set in Turkey
Films directed by Joseph Sargent
Films set in Israel
Films set in Jordan
Films set in Palestine (region)
Films set in Egypt
Films shot in Morocco
Bible Collection
Das Erste original programming
Biographical television films
Films scored by Ennio Morricone
1993 in Italian television
1990s English-language films
American drama television films
1990s American films
1990s German films